Christina Viktoria Niederer (born 15 September 1996 in St. Gallen) is a former Swiss figure skater and dancer with Russian roots. She is the 2007 and 2008 Swiss Junior Champion, the Bronze Medallist of 2009 and the Vice Swiss Champion of 2010 in Latin Dance and Ballroom Dancing. Christina Niederer was a member of the Swiss Olympic Team in Figure Skating. Furthermore, she has the Russian citizenship.

Career

Family 
Niederer is Marcel Niederer's daughter, who played ice hockey. Her mother is a native-born Russian. Niederer has two sisters lives with her family near St. Gallen, Switzerland.

Dancesport and Figure Skating 

Niederer started her dancing career at the age of 7. Simultaneously, Christina Niederer made a start on figure skating. At the age of 9, Christina Niederer started practicing professionally. Her first coaches were Daniel Steinmann and Martinas Kura in Latin Dance / Ballroom Dancing and Claudia Aebischer in Figure Skating. At the tender age of 11, Niederer has already won her first Latin Dance and Ballroom Dancing Swiss Champion titles in Juniors with her dancing partner, David Buechel. 
2008 they defended their two titles. At the same time, Christina Niederer participated in the Swiss Championships in Figure Skating. Shortly after Niederer won the silver medal at the Swiss Championship of 2010 in Latin Dance and Ballroom Dancing, she decided to stop her dancing career and focus on figure skating. 
Aged 15, Christina Niederer switched to Elena Romanova and trained at summertime with the famous Russian figure skating coach, Viktor Kudriavtsev. At the age of only 15 years, Christina Niederer passed the highest possible test to reach (Gold Test) thus qualified for the Swiss National Championships. She passed through all the categories and took part in every Swiss National Championship from 2009 to 2015. 
2014, Christina Niederer changed her environment and switched to the Figure Skating Club of Zurich (Eissportclub Zuerich-Oerlikon) and trained with Gheorghe Chiper. 
Due to a hip injury, Christina Niederer decided to change her discipline to Ice Dancing. With her former Ukrainian partner, Niederer moved in spring 2015 to Moscow in order to train with the former partner of Anna Semenovich, Denis Samokhin, and aspire to an internationally successful season. In August 2015, Christina Niederer fell hard while a difficult lift and suffered a concussion. As a consequence of her injury, she decided to stop her athletic career and began studies. Christina Niederer holds two degrees from the University of St. Gallen (HSG) (Bachelor of Arts in Business Administration and Master of Arts in Business Innovation).

Results 

S = Schüler, N = Nachwuchs, J = Junioren *only short program skated

References

External links 
 Schweizermeistertitel Tanzsport Junioren 2007.
 Schweizermeistertitel Tanzsport Juniorenn 2008.
 Silber fuer Christina Niederer im Eiskunstlaufen.
 Niederer ist zum ersten Mal Meisterin.
 Goldtest bestanden. Eiskunstlauf.
 Swiss Cup Chur. Rang 2.
 Arge Alp - Christina Niederer ist die Tochter des Eishockeystars Marcel Niederer.
 Trophée Romand. Rang 3.
 Souveräner Sieg an der Ostschweizermeisterschaft.
 Christina Niederer wird zum dritten Mal Meisterin.
 Silbermedaille für Christina Niederer.
 Erster Elite-Sieg für Niederer.
 Erster Elite-Sieg beim grössten Swiss-Cup.
 Karriereeende. Studium an der Universität St. Gallen.

1996 births
Living people
Swiss female single skaters
Swiss female dancers
Sportspeople from St. Gallen (city)